Mohammad Ali Siddiqui (2 February 1944 – 4 November 2014) was a Bangladeshi playback singer. He was a singer in the 1960s, 1970s and 1980s. He has sung a total of 250 songs in his career spanning over three decades. He was awarded with several prizes including the National Award, Dinesh Padak, Bandhan Lifetime Award and Shilpakala Academy Award.

Discography

Film songs

References 

1944 births
2014 deaths
People from Netrokona District
20th-century Bangladeshi male singers
20th-century Bangladeshi singers
Bangladeshi playback singers